Royal Pines is a census-designated place (CDP) in Buncombe County, North Carolina, United States. The population was 4,272 at the 2010 census. It is part of the Asheville Metropolitan Statistical Area.

Geography
Royal Pines is located in southern Buncombe County at  (35.477386, -82.509833). It is bordered to the west by U.S. Route 25A and the city limits of Asheville, and to the northeast by Mills Gap Road.

Demographics

As of the census of 2000, there were 5,334 people, 2,133 households, and 1,540 families residing in the CDP. The population density was 1,753.0 people per square mile (677.5/km). There were 2,303 housing units at an average density of 756.9 per square mile (292.5/km). The racial makeup of the CDP was 93.98% White, 3.47% African American, 0.13% Native American, 1.07% Asian, 0.37% from other races, and 0.97% from two or more races. Hispanic or Latino of any race were 0.79% of the population.

There were 2,133 households, out of which 34.0% had children under the age of 18 living with them, 59.9% were married couples living together, 9.5% had a female householder with no husband present, and 27.8% were non-families. 23.1% of all households were made up of individuals, and 5.0% had someone living alone who was 65 years of age or older. The average household size was 2.45 and the average family size was 2.90.

In the CDP, the population was spread out, with 24.3% under the age of 18, 5.4% from 18 to 24, 29.7% from 25 to 44, 28.4% from 45 to 64, and 12.3% who were 65 years of age or older. The median age was 40 years. For every 100 females, there were 91.0 males. For every 100 females age 18 and over, there were 87.0 males.

The median income for a household in the CDP was $52,426, and the median income for a family was $60,885. Males had a median income of $42,679 versus $29,188 for females. The per capita income for the CDP was $27,886. About 0.4% of families and 2.5% of the population were below the poverty line, including 1.4% of those under age 18 and 2.2% of those age 65 or over.

References

Census-designated places in Buncombe County, North Carolina
Census-designated places in North Carolina
Asheville metropolitan area